Daniel Silverberg is an American assistant director of film and television.

Silverberg has served as the first assistant director on numerous, notable films including Pitch Perfect 3 (2017), Pitch Perfect 2 (2015), Daddy's Home (2015), Just Go With It (2011), Hairspray (2007), Bedtime Stories (2008), Cheaper By The Dozen 2 (2005), The Pacifier (2005), Along Came Polly (2005) and Bringing Down the House (2003).

He has also worked as an assistant director on a variety of television series including Glee., Grounded for Life, Andy Richter Controls the Universe and Numb3rs.

As a head director, he directed an episode of the UPN series Clueless and Shasta McNasty, both in 1999.

References

External links

American film directors
American television directors
Living people
Place of birth missing (living people)
Year of birth missing (living people)